Herman Sang is a pianist from Bournemouth Gardens, Jamaica, who was a member of the Jiving Juniors.   He was also in Alley Cats, The City Slickers, Hersan and the City Slickers, and Hersang and His Combo. He is the younger brother of Claude Sang Jr. Sang formed the Jiving Juniors in 1958 with Eugene Dwyer, Derrick Harriott, and Maurice Wynter.

References

External links
AllMusic Credits
Reggaejamaicaway profile

Living people
Jamaican musicians
Year of birth missing (living people)
People from Kingston, Jamaica